Frederick Yates (October 3, 1914 – October 9, 1971) was an American politician and lawyer.

Born in Malvern, Arkansas, Yates moved with his family to Detroit, Michigan in 1925. In 1932, Yates graduated from Northwestern High School. He received his bachelor's degree from West Virginia State University in 1936 and his law degree from Detroit College of Law. He practiced law in Detroit, Michigan. Yates worked as a playground supervisor for the Detroit Parks and Recreation Department and at the Ford Motor and US Rubber factories to help pay for his education. From 1955 until 1962, Yates served in the Michigan House of Representatives and was a Democrat. He then served on the Wayne County, Michigan Board of Commissioners from 1968 until his death in 1971. Yates died at the Wayne County Hospital, in Detroit, Michigan from a long illness.

Notes

External links
PoliticalGraveyard.com.-Frederick Yates

1914 births
1971 deaths
People from Malvern, Arkansas
Politicians from Detroit
West Virginia State University alumni
Detroit College of Law alumni
Michigan lawyers
African-American state legislators in Michigan
County commissioners in Michigan
Democratic Party members of the Michigan House of Representatives
20th-century American politicians
20th-century American lawyers
20th-century African-American politicians